The Zoroasteridae are one of three families of Asteroidea (sea stars) in the order Forcipulatida. It contains seven living genera and one extinct genus.

Genera
The living genera described are:
 Bythiolophus Fisher, 1916 (monotypic)
 B. acanthinus Fisher, 1916
 Cnemidaster Sladen, 1889 (six species)
 Doraster Downey, 1970 (monotypic)
 D. constellatus Downey, 1970
 Myxoderma Fisher, 1905 (five species)
 Pholidaster Sladen, 1889 (monotypic)
 P. squamatus Sladen, 1889
 Sagenaster Mah, 2007 (monotypic)
 S. evermanni (Fisher, 1905)
 Zoroaster Thomson, 1873 (20 species)

The extinct genus known is:
 Terminaster Hess, 1974†

Distribution
Species in this family are widespread, distributed mainly in Pacific, Atlantic, and Indian Oceans. A few are found in the Arctic and Antarctic Oceans.

References

 Sladen, W.P. (1889). Report on the Asteroidea. Report on the Scientific Results of the Voyage of H.M.S. Challenger during the years 1873-1876, Zoology 30(51): xlii + 893 pages 118 plates.
 Hansson, H.G. (2001). Echinodermata, in: Costello, M.J. et al. (Ed.) (2001). European register of marine species: a check-list of the marine species in Europe and a bibliography of guides to their identification. Collection Patrimoines Naturels, 50: pp. 336–351 (look up in IMIS)

Further reading
EOL.org

Forcipulatida
Echinoderm families